El Mehdi Chokri (born 23 January 1997) is a Moroccan cyclist, who currently rides for Moroccan amateur team AJ Amer C.

Major results

2014
 2nd  Time trial, Arab Junior Road Championships
2015
 African Junior Road Championships
1st  Road race
2nd  Team time trial
3rd  Individual time trial
 Arab Junior Road Championships
1st  Time trial
1st  Team time trial
 1st  Time trial, National Junior Road Championships
2016
 1st  Team pursuit, African Track Championships (with Abderrahim Aouida, Soufiane Sahbaoui and Mohcine El Kouraji)
 2nd Overall Tour de Côte d'Ivoire
1st Stage 4
2017
 National Under-23 Road Championships
1st  Time trial
2nd Road race
2018
 2nd Overall Tour de l'Espoir
2019
 1st  Time trial, National Road Championships
 1st  Time trial, National Under-23 Road Championships
 2nd Gran Premio Industrie del Marmo
 7th Overall Tour du Maroc
1st  Young rider classification
1st Stage 6

References

External links

1997 births
Living people
Moroccan male cyclists